Tamara Grigoryevna Miansarova (née Remnyova, ; 5 March 1931 – 12 July 2017) was a Soviet Ukrainian lyric soprano, pop singer and professor of Russian Academy of Theatre Arts, best known for her hit May There Always Be Sunshine.

Biography
She was born on March 5, 1931, in Zinovievsk.

She received her education at a music school attached to the Minsk Conservatory, which she graduated in 1951. In the same year she entered the piano department of the Moscow Conservatory (class of Lev Oborin).

She died on July 12, 2017, in Moscow.

Awards and recognition
1963: 1st prize at the Sopot International Song Festival, for the song "May There Always Be Sunshine"
1972: Meritorious Artist of the Ukrainian SSR
1996: People's Artist of Russia
Order of Friendship of Peoples
 2004: Miansarova get star on the Star Square in Moscow.

Hits
Miansarova performed over 400 songs, many of them remembered as hits (their recording may be found at Miansarova's site).
"Ginger", in the meaning of red haired man), a rendering the song "Rudy Rydz" by Helena Majdaniec, Queen of Polish Twist, the first Twist song performed in Russian on stage
"Black Cat" It was the first Soviet Twist.
"May There Always Be Sunshine"
"Летка-енка" (for the fad dance Letkajenkka)
"Let Us Never Quarrel"
"Step, Step, a Toddler Is Stepping"
"Eyes on the Sand"

References

External links 
 

1931 births
2017 deaths
Musicians from Kropyvnytskyi
Soviet women singers
People's Artists of Russia
Recipients of the Order of Friendship of Peoples
Moscow Conservatory alumni
Soviet music educators
Russian music educators
Soviet sopranos
Russian sopranos
20th-century Russian women singers
20th-century Russian singers
Women music educators
20th-century women educators
Russian people of Ukrainian descent